Adin Džafić (born 21 May 1989) is a Bosnian-Herzegovinian retired footballer who last played for Austrian side SC Rabenstein.

International career
He made his debut for Bosnia and Herzegovina in a December 2010 friendly match against Poland. It remained his sole international appearance.

References

External links

 

1989 births
Living people
People from Srebrenik
Association football forwards
Bosnia and Herzegovina footballers
Bosnia and Herzegovina under-21 international footballers
Bosnia and Herzegovina international footballers
NK Čelik Zenica players
HNK Cibalia players
FK Velež Mostar players
FK Sarajevo players
FK Sloboda Tuzla players
OFK Gradina players
San Antonio Scorpions players
FK Radnički Lukavac players
FK Jedinstvo Brčko players
Premier League of Bosnia and Herzegovina players
Croatian Football League players
First League of the Federation of Bosnia and Herzegovina players
Bosnia and Herzegovina expatriate footballers
Expatriate footballers in Croatia
Bosnia and Herzegovina expatriate sportspeople in Croatia
Expatriate soccer players in the United States
Bosnia and Herzegovina expatriate sportspeople in the United States
Expatriate footballers in Austria
Bosnia and Herzegovina expatriate sportspeople in Austria